Vi gör så gott vi kan is a song written by Lasse Holm and Gert Lengstrand as a fight song for the Sweden national football team for the 1978 FIFA World Cup in Argentina.

The song was recorded by the Swedish national team players together with Schytts The recording ends with Ralf Edström adding "En gör så gött en kan" ("You do as good as you can"). On 11 June 1978, the song entered the Svensktoppen chart, reaching seventh position, only to have been knocked out of chart the upcoming week.

References

1978 FIFA World Cup
1978 songs
Schytts songs
Songs written by Lasse Holm
Sweden national football team songs
Swedish-language songs
Songs written by Gert Lengstrand
1978 in Swedish football